East Dagon Township (also East Dagon Myothit) is located in the easternmost part of Yangon, Myanmar. The township comprises 54 wards and three village tracts. It shares borders with Hlegu Township in the north, North Dagon Township in the west, and South Dagon Township in the south and west. One of new satellite towns founded in 1989 by the military government that came to power in 1988, East Dagon is still largely undeveloped and lacks basic municipal services.

The township has 19 primary schools, four middle schools and two high schools.

The Ngamoyeik creek cuts through East Dagon Township. The Togyaunggalay Railway Station is a stop on the Yangon Circular Railway, and Myanmar Railways's Yangon-Bago line. Several bus lines connect East Dagon to downtown and other parts of the city.

References

 Yangon City Rail to Suburban

Townships of Yangon